Kale is a district of Malatya Province of Turkey. The mayor is Cemal Akdemir (AKP).

Demographics 
The district is fully Sunni Kurdish with the exception of one Kurdish Alevi village.

References

Populated places in Malatya Province
Districts of Malatya Province
Kurdish settlements in Turkey